The London and North Western Railway (LNWR) John Hick class was a class of ten 2-2-2-2 steam locomotives designed for express passenger work by F. W. Webb.

History
They were broadly similar to the earlier Greater Britain class, the principal difference being smaller driving wheels, as their intended use was on the more-steeply graded Northern Section.

The first of the ten locomotives was built in February 1894, and the remaining nine came from Crewe Works between January and April 1898.

They were three-cylinder compound locomotives: the two outside high-pressure cylinders drove the trailing drivers via Howe-Stephenson valve gear, the one inside low-pressure cylinder drive the leading drivers via a slip eccentric. There was no connection between the two sets of drivers.

All the locomotives were named; one unusual feature (shared with the Greater Britain class) was that the names were split over two nameplates, one on each driving wheel splasher. This necessitated the use of two-word names, rather than some of the abbreviated names the LNWR had previously used. The names chosen continued the Greater Britain theme.

They continued in service until Webb's retirement. His successor, George Whale, preferred simple superheated locomotives; consequently they were all scrapped between 1907 and 1912.

Fleet list

See also
LNWR Whale Experiment Class
LNWR George the Fifth Class

References

External links
 LNWR Society Photographs of the Webb 2-2-2-2 John Hick class steam locomotives.

John Hick
2-2-2-2 locomotives
Duplex locomotives
Railway locomotives introduced in 1894
Standard gauge steam locomotives of Great Britain